Liu He (born 25 March 1961) is a Chinese engineer who is deputy chief engineer of the Research Institute of Petroleum Exploration and Development, an academician of the Chinese Academy of Engineering, and honorary dean of School of Economics and Management, Northeast Petroleum University.

Biography 
Liu was born in Harbin, Heilongjiang, on 25 March 1961. After graduating from Daqing Petroleum Institute (Northeast Petroleum University) in 1982, he was despatched to Daqing Oilfield as a technician. He earned a B.S. degree from Daqing Petroleum Institute and a Ph.D degree in engineering from Harbin Engineering University. In March 2018, he was engaged by Harbin Engineering University as a part-time professor.

Honours and awards 
 2005 State Science and Technology Progress Award (Second Class)
 2008 State Science and Technology Progress Award (Second Class)
 2010 State Science and Technology Progress Award (Special Prize)
 2014 Guanghua Engineering Technology Award
 27 November 2017 Member of the Chinese Academy of Engineering (CAE)

References 

1961 births
Living people
People from Harbin
Engineers from Heilongjiang
Northeast Petroleum University alumni
Harbin Engineering University alumni
Academic staff of Harbin Engineering University
Members of the Chinese Academy of Engineering